Subcarpathia may refer to:

 geographical region of Outer Subcarpathia
 Polish Subcarpathia, a section of outer-subcarpathian region in modern Poland
 Ukrainian Subcarpathia, a section of outer-subcarpathian region in modern Ukraine; see Prykarpattia
 Bukovinian Subcarpathia, a section of outer-subcarpathians in the region of Bukovina
 Moldavian Subcarpathia, a section of outer-subcarpathians in the region of Moldavia

 geographical region of Inner Subcarpathia
 Region of Subcarpathia (1919-1938), an administrative region in the First Czechoslovak Republic
 Autonomous Subcarpathian Rus' (1938-1939), an autonomous region in the Second Czechoslovak Republic
 Governorate of Subcarpathia, a civil administration established after the annexation by Hungary in 1939

See also
 Subcarpathian (disambiguation)
 Carpathian (disambiguation)
 Carpathia (disambiguation)
 Ciscarpathian (disambiguation)
 Transcarpathia (disambiguation)
 Zakarpattia (disambiguation)